Sinibotys is a genus of moths of the family Crambidae.

Species
Sinibotys butleri (South in Leech & South, 1901)
Sinibotys evenoralis (Walker, 1859)
Sinibotys hoenei (Caradja, 1932)
Sinibotys mandarinalis (Leech, 1889)
Sinibotys obliquilinealis Inoue, 1982

References

Natural History Museum Lepidoptera genus database

Pyraustinae
Crambidae genera
Taxa named by Eugene G. Munroe